The official results of the Women's Pole Vault at the 2000 Summer Olympics in Sydney, Australia, held on Monday 25 September 2000. There were a total number of 30 participating athletes in this event, which made its Olympic debut. The qualifying round was held on Saturday 23 September 2000, with the qualifying height set at 4.35 metres.

While the pole vault had been a standard Olympic event for a century, dating back to the first revival in 1896, this was the first time the event had been held for women.

The favorite coming into the event was world champion and world record holder Stacy Dragila, but the home favorite was Soviet transplant Australian Tatiana Grigorieva. At 4.55m these were the only two athletes still in the competition. Vala Flosadóttir, who had held the lead with a clean record to 4.50m, took the bronze medal, and set the National record while taking the only women's Olympic medal for Iceland to date. With Dragila's 4 misses in the competition, including one at 4.55m, Grigorieva had the lead. At 4.60m, Dragila reversed that with a clean clearance on her first attempt. Grigorieva was unable to match that and strategically moved to 4.65m, 2 cm higher than the world record Dragila had set in Sacramento in qualifying to the Olympics, to try to take the win.  Neither competitor was able to clear 4.65m, Dragila took the gold and the Olympic record.

Schedule

All times are Australian Eastern Standard Time (UTC+10)

Records
, the existing World record was as follows. As this was a new event in the Olympics, no previous Olympic record existed.

The following record(s) were established during the competition:

Results

Qualifying round 
Rule: Qualifying standard 4.35 (Q) or at least best 12 qualified (q).

Final

See also
 1998 Women's European Championships Pole Vault (Budapest)
 1999 Women's World Championships Pole Vault (Seville)
 2001 Women's World Championships Pole Vault (Edmonton)
 2002 Women's European Championships Pole Vault (Munich)

References

External links
 Results

P
Pole vault at the Olympics
2000 in women's athletics
Women's events at the 2000 Summer Olympics